The 2020 Europe Top 16 Cup (also referred to as the 2020 CCB Europe Top 16 Cup for sponsorship reasons) was a table tennis competition held from 8 to 9 February in Montreux, Switzerland, organised under the authority of the European Table Tennis Union (ETTU). It was the 49th edition of the event, and the fifth time that it had been held in Switzerland.

Medallists

Men's singles

Seeding

Players were seeded according to the European ranking for January 2020.

Main draw

Women's singles

Seeding

Players were seeded according to the European ranking for January 2020.

Main draw

See also

2020 ITTF-ATTU Asian Cup
2020 ITTF Pan-America Cup

References

External links
Official website
ITTF website

Europe Top 16 Cup
Europe Top 16 Cup
Europe Top 16 Cup
Table tennis competitions in Switzerland
International sports competitions hosted by Switzerland
Sport in Montreux
Europe Top 16 Cup